Tatyana Snezhina (14 May 1972 – 21 August 1995) was a Russian poet and singer-songwriter. Her original family name is Pechyonkina. She wrote more than 200 songs which were performing by herself and – after her death – by many Russian popular artists.

Early life
Tatyana was born in Voroshilovgrad on 14 May 1972. Her father was a military commissioned officer. Her mother was a technologist at the factory. Soon after her birth, the family moved to Petropavlovsk-Kamchatsky, where Tatyana attended the school No.4 and started to study in a local music school. In 1981, the family moved to Moscow. In that period, she began to perform self-penned songs. In 1992, the family moved to Novosibirsk. Tatyana enrolled at the Novosibirsk medical institute.

Professional singer career
In 1993, Tatyana took the pseudonym Snezhina and started working on her first album "Вспомни со мной" contained 21 songs written by Tatyana. In 1994, she first performed on a stage of the Moscow State Estrada Theatre. She was the subject of the report on the Radio Rossii.

She met Sergey Bugayov, record producer and the head of a recording studio, and he became her producer. Soon, they began an affair. They were planning on getting married on 13 September 1995.

Death
Tatyana Snezhina and Sergey Bugayov died in the traffic accident at 106th kilometer of the R256 highway, located in Cherepanovsky District of Novosibirsk Oblast, on 21 August 1995.

Initially, she was buried in Zayeltsovskoye Cemetery in Novosibirsk but subsequently reburied in Troyekurovskoye Cemetery in Moscow.

After death
In 1997, Alla Pugacheva performed the Tatyana Snezhina song "Позови меня с собой" at the Slavianski Bazaar Festival, and it became a hit record. In 2015, the lyrics of this song took 23rd place in the top-100 of the most famous Russian poetry in the history.

In late 1990s – early 2000s, the songs written by Tatyana Snezhina were performed by many famous artists, such as Joseph Kobzon, Kristina Orbakaitė, Lolita Milyavskaya, Mikhail Shufutinsky, Lada Dance, Lev Leshchenko, Alisa Mon, Tatiana Bulanova, etc.

Legacy

 In 1998, one of peaks of Altai Mountains (44° 58' 30.313" N; 79° 19' 55.247" E) was named after Tatyana Snezhina.
 Since 2008, Novosibirsk has held an annual Television Young Song Performers Contest "Ordynka" dedicated to the memory of Tatyana Snezhina and Sergey Bugayev.
 In 2010, the bronze monument to Tatyana Snezhina was opened in Luhansk.
 In 2011, one of the streets in Novosibirsk was named after Tatyana Snezhina.
 In 2013, the monument to Tatyana Snezhina was opened in Novosibirsk.

References

External links
 Tatyana Snezhina memorial website

1972 births
1995 deaths
People from Luhansk
Russian women singers